Oumayma is a given name. Notable people with the name include:

Oumayma Belahbib (born 1996), Moroccan amateur boxer
Oumayma Ben Maaouia, Tunisian footballer and manager
Oumayma Dardour (born 1996), Tunisian handball player